Kangaroo Jack: G'Day U.S.A.! (also known as Kangaroo Jack 2 or Kangaroo Jack 2: G'Day U.S.A.!) is a 2004 animated action comedy film. It is a sequel to 2003's Kangaroo Jack that is directed by Ron Myrick and Jeffrey Gatrall. Released direct-to-video in 2004, it was produced by Warner Bros. Animation, Castle Rock Entertainment and was distributed by Warner Bros.

Synopsis 

The movie takes place some time after the first film. Charlie Carbone (Josh Keaton), his wife Jessie (Kath Soucie), and his best friend Louis Booker (Ahmed Best) travel to Australia once again and it is up to them to save the animals of the outback from danger by poachers along with the help of their old friend Jackie Legs (Jeff Bennett). This movie is actually about the kangaroo unlike the original.

Voice Cast 
 Jeff Bennett as Kangaroo "Jackie Legs" Jack, a rapping red kangaroo. He was previously voiced by an uncredited Adam Garcia in the first film.
 Jeff Bennett also voices Larry, an echidna on Outback Ollie's show.
 Jeff Bennett also voices a lounge singer.
 Josh Keaton as Charlie Carbone, the owner of a shampoo company and stepson of Salvatore Maggio. He was previously portrayed by Jerry O'Connell in the first film.
 Ahmed Best as Louis Booker, Charlie's slow-witted best friend. He was previously portrayed by Anthony Anderson in the first film.
 Kath Soucie as Jessie Carbone, Charlie's wife and former wildlife preserve worker. Unlike the previous film where she was blonde, Jessie has red hair. She was previously portrayed by Estella Warren in the first film.
 Kath Soucie also voices Mrs. Sperling, a crazy elderly woman who is one of Ronald's customers.
 Keith Diamond as Ronnie Booker, Louis' selfish and unintelligent cousin who works as an exterminator at "Quit Bugging Me" and a limousine driver.
 Keith Diamond also voices Killer Putulski, a heavyweight boxing champion that appears in Louis' dream of being defeated by Jackie.
 Jim Ward as Outback Ollie, a park owner and TV show host who covers up his illegal smuggling activities.
 Phil LaMarr as Rico and Mikey, the henchmen of Outback Ollie. Rico has a scar that looks like a smile on his forehead while Mikey has a snake tattoo on his left arm.
 Obba Babatundé as Chief Ankamuti, the leader and medicine man of the Aborigines.
 Dorian Harewood as Agent Jackson, an FBI agent who thought Charlie and his friends were stealing Jackie from Outback Ollie and lost them when Jackie caused a large traffic jam.
 Carlos Alazraqui as Dude #1
 Jess Harnell as Frilled Lizard, an unnamed frilled lizard who appears in Louis' first dream and the film's epilogue.
 Jess Harnell also voices Dude #2.
 Jeannie Elias as Elderly Woman
 Wendee Lee as Limousine Girl
 Steve Miller as the Emu, an emu that was caught by Rico and Mikey.

Crew 
 Jamie Simone - Casting and Voice Director

Songs 
The film featured a rendition of LL Cool J's single "Mama Said Knock You Out" during the dream boxing scene. The film also featured a few lines from "I Only Have Eyes for You" when Jackie is in the lounge. Jeff Bennett performed both songs, and the song that plays when Jackie is causing havoc is The Ohio Players song "Fire".

Reception 
Kangaroo Jack: G'Day U.S.A.! was met with mostly negative reviews from critics and audiences, but received a much better score than the first film, including a 38% on Rotten Tomatoes.

References

External links 

 
 

2004 films
2004 animated films
2004 direct-to-video films
2000s American animated films
2000s English-language films
2000s fantasy comedy films
Animated films about kangaroos and wallabies
American fantasy comedy films
American sequel films
Australian sequel films
Warner Bros. direct-to-video animated films
Warner Bros. animated films
Warner Bros. Animation animated films
Castle Rock Entertainment films
Films set in Australia
Films set in the Las Vegas Valley
Direct-to-video sequel films
Direct-to-video animated films
2004 comedy films
American children's animated action films